Palmroth is a Swedish-language surname, more common in Finland than in Sweden.

Geographical distribution
As of 2014, 57.5% of all known bearers of the surname Palmroth were residents of Finland (frequency 1:20,743), 25.2% of Sweden (1:84,886), 8.9% of Germany (1:1,956,796), 6.3% of the United States (1:12,456,941) and 1.7% of Estonia (1:165,209).

In Finland, the frequency of the surname was higher than national average (1:20,743) in the following regions:
 1. Pirkanmaa (1:5,958)
 2. Southwest Finland (1:8,961)
 3. South Ostrobothnia (1:11,522)
 4. Ostrobothnia (1:12,414)
 5. Satakunta (1:15,246)

In Sweden, the frequency of the surname was higher than national average (1:84,886) in the following counties:
 1. Södermanland County (1:23,268)
 2. Örebro County (1:28,520)
 3. Västmanland County (1:28,819)
 4. Stockholm County (1:40,793)
 5. Jämtland County (1:42,753)
 6. Uppsala County (1:69,953)

People
 Pertti Palmroth (1931-2020), Finnish footwear designer
 Tero Palmroth (born 1953), Finnish driver in the CART Championship Car series
 Minna Palmroth, professor in computational space physics at the University of Helsinki
 Markus Palmroth (born 1989), Finnish ice hockey defenceman

References

Swedish-language surnames